The Skellefte River ( or ;) is a river in northern Sweden; one of the major Norrland rivers.

Geographically, it starts in the Norrbotten County, also known as the Swedish Lappland province where it drains the lakes Hornavan, Uddjaur and Storavan near Arjeplog; then goes south-east into Västerbotten County, passing through the town Skellefteå (which has given it its name), and finally discharging in the Gulf of Bothnia, in the Västerbotten province.

It is one of the major northern Swedish rivers, with a length of 410 kilometers. Like many large northern rivers, it has been cultivated for water power.

There are several tributaries to the river, with the largest ones named: Malån, Petikån, Finnforsån, Bjurån and Klintforsån.

Salmons and trouts are being put out to compensate for the water power plants, and the river and its tributary are all popular destinations for fishers.  Especially popular is the town Skellefteå, known as "Fishing in City".

See also
Some of the other large Norrland rivers:
 Kalix River
 Torne River
 Lule River
 Pite River
 Ume River
 Ångerman River

References

Rivers of Norrbotten County
Rivers of Västerbotten County